Kunčice may refer to several places in the Czech Republic:
 Kunčice (Hradec Králové District), village in Hradec Králové District
 Kunčice nad Labem, village in Trutnov District
 Kunčice pod Ondřejníkem, village in Frýdek-Místek District
 Kunčice (Ostrava), part of the city of Ostrava
 Kunčice (Šumperk District) - a part of Staré Město Municipality.